Tall-e Quchan (also Romanized as Tall-e Qūchān; also known as Tel-i-Guchān) is a village in Tolbozan Rural District, Golgir District, Masjed Soleyman County, Khuzestan Province, Iran. At the 2006 census, its population was 49, in 9 families.

References 

Populated places in Masjed Soleyman County